Theodora Salusbury (1875–1956) was an artist and craftswoman in the Arts & Crafts-style. After training with some of the best artists in the field, she worked as a stained glass artist at her studios in Cornwall and London. Salusbury's windows would be leaded up by Lowndes & Drury. Dating mostly from between the two World Wars, the windows were destined for nearly thirty churches in England and Wales, several of them in Leicestershire, Salusbury's home county.

The impact of Salusbury's windows comes through her use of colour and her representation of the figures she portrayed. Most of her work bears her signature, a peacock.

Other sources
 McWhirr, A. (1999). Century to millennium: St James the Greater, Leicester, 1899–1999. Leicester: PCC of St James the Greater.
 Maltby, G & Loutit, A. (2018). Theodora Salusbury 1875–1956 Stained Glass Artist. .

1875 births
1956 deaths
20th-century English women artists
English stained glass artists and manufacturers
People from Leicester